Jura may refer to:

Places
Jura, Scotland, island of the Inner Hebrides off Great Britain
Jūra, river in Lithuania

Mountain ranges
Jura Mountains, on the French–Swiss–German border
Franconian Jura, south-central Germany
Swabian Jura, south-western Germany
Montes Jura, on the Moon near Mare Imbrium

Regions
Jura (department), France
Canton of Jura, Switzerland
Bernese Jura, part of the Swiss canton of Bern
Polish Jura, an upland of southern Poland

Villages
Jura, Ontario, Canada
Jura, Transnistria, Moldova
Al-Jura, Mandatory Palestine
Al-Jura, Jerusalem, Mandatory Palestine

Companies and organisations
Jura Books, anarchist bookshop in Sydney, Australia
Jura distillery, Scotch whisky distillery on the island of Jura
Jura Elektroapparate, Swiss developer and distributor of home appliances
Jura Federation, the anarchist, Bakuninist faction of the 19th century First International

Ships 
Jura (ship, 1854), steamship on Lake Neuchâtel, Switzerland, and Lake Constance
Jura (ship, 2006), vessel of the Scottish Fisheries Protection Agency

Other uses
 Jurassic, a geological period
 Jura, or iura, plural of jus (or ius), in Roman law
 Jura (given name), Slavic masculine name
 Jura wine, a French wine region

See also 
 Jurassien dialect, a dialect of Franco-Provençal
 Gyula (disambiguation)